Key for Life (stylized as KEY FOR LIFE) is the 12th CD single by Minori Chihara. It was released simultaneously with her 11th single, Defection. The single ranked 10th on the Oricon charts in the week it debuted.

Track listing
Key for Life
Happy Kaleidoscope

References

Lantis (company) singles
2011 singles
Minori Chihara songs
2011 songs